Philip John Landrigan (born June 14, 1942), is an American epidemiologist and pediatrician and one of the world's leading advocates of children's health.

His work has been recognized by national non-profit organization Healthy Child Healthy World (Lifetime Achievement Award) and the U.S. Environmental Protection Agency (Child Health Champion Award), and he is included in New York Magazine's list of "Best Doctors 2008."

His books include Raising Healthy Children in a Toxic World: 101 Smart Solutions for Every Family and, with Herbert Needleman, Raising Children Toxic Free: How to Keep Your Child Safe From Lead, Asbestos, Pesticides and Other Environmental Hazards. He has published over 500 scientific papers.

He was formerly the Director of the Children's Environmental Health Center and the Ethel Wise Professor and Chair of the Department of Preventive Medicine at Mount Sinai Medical Center in New York City.

In 2018 he became the founding director of Boston College's Global Public Health Program and the Global Pollution Observatory within the Schiller Institute for Integrated Science and Society.

Biography

Public health advocate
Landrigan's reputation rests largely on his role as a highly credible evidence-based advocate for public health, specifically in his focus on reducing the level of children's exposure to lead and pesticides and for his participation in the World Health Organization's global campaign to eradicate smallpox. He was also a central figure in developing the National Children's Study and in the medical and epidemiological studies that followed the destruction of the World Trade Center on September 11, 2001. Additionally, from 1995 to 1997, Landrigan served on the Presidential Advisory Committee on Gulf War Veteran's Illnesses, and, in 1997 and 1998, served as Senior Advisor on Children's Health to the Administrator of the U.S. Environmental Protection Agency, where he helped establish the Office of Children's Health Protection.

He has been awarded the Meritorious Service Medal of the US Public Health Service and is a frequent consultant to the World Health Organization, which called Landrigan's work "instrumental in passing the Food Quality Protection Act of 1996."

In 2005, Landrigan, along with Drs. Ramon Murphy and David Muller, founded the Global Health Center, a division of the Mount Sinai Medical Center dedicated to finding evidence-based solutions to global health problems.

Lead
In the early 1970s, Landrigan took on ASARCO, a smelting company and one of the largest employers in El Paso, Texas. In testing the blood of children attending schools near ASARCO's El Paso smelting plant, Landrigan concluded that 60% of children living within one mile of the smelter had elevated blood lead levels and that even small amounts of lead exposure lowers a child's IQ. In a later study (2002), Landrigan correlated childhood lead exposure and lifetime earning potential, concluding that current levels of lead exposure in the United States amount to an aggregate income loss of over $40 billion a year.

Landrigan and his studies played a key role in the government mandate phasing out lead components from gasoline, beginning in 1975, and the federal ban on lead paint in 1978 – culminating in an 88% drop in lead levels in American children by 2005.

Pesticides
Beginning in 1988, at the request of U.S. Senator Patrick Leahy of Vermont, Landrigan led a 5-year study at the National Academy of Sciences to examine whether the accepted standard for pesticide exposure – aimed to protect a 150-pound adult – was adequate to protect the health of children. In 1993, the Landrigan Committee released a report, Pesticides in the Diets of Infants and Children, that was the first to prove that children are uniquely susceptible to adverse effects of pesticides. The report called for standards ten times more stringent than those in effect at publication.

Asbestos
On February 11, 2002, Landrigan testified before the House Committee on Education and the Workforce on the impacts of the September 11 attacks on the health of children. Landrigan addressed the issue of asbestos particles found in the air:

"Almost no data exist on the possible long-term consequences of low-level asbestos in early childhood. Causes of malignant mesothelioma have, however, been reported in the grown children of asbestos workers who were exposed to take-home asbestos; among non-working women in the asbestos mining townships of Quebec who were exposed in the community; and among long term residents of a community near an asbestos-cement plant in Northern Italy."

In October 2001, New York Magazine noted disagreement between Landrigan and the EPA over the dangers posed by asbestos particles found in the air immediately after the September 11 attacks. While generally agreeing that significant risk was to the rescue workers alone, Landrigan disagreed with the EPA that tiny asbestos particles were too small to be considered dangerous, saying, "It's been substantiated by 30 or 40 years of research that the smaller fibers are the ones that can penetrate most deeply into the lungs."

Education
Landrigan graduated Boston Latin School in 1959 and Boston College in 1963. He received his medical degree from Harvard Medical School in 1967 and completed his internship at Cleveland Metropolitan General Hospital and his residency at Boston Children's Hospital.

His post-graduate education included the London School of Hygiene and Tropical Medicine and his completion, with distinction, of a Master of Science in Occupational Medicine at the University of London.

Military service
From 1996 to 2005, Landrigan served in the Medical Corps of the United States Naval Reserve, retiring at the rank of Captain. He continues to serve as Deputy Command Surgeon General of the New York Naval Militia. From 2000 to 2002, he served on the Armed Forces Epidemiological Board.

He received Navy & Marine Corps Commendation Medals in 2002, 2003, and 2005, the Secretary of Defense Medal for Outstanding Public Service in 2002, and the National Defense Service Medal in 2003.

Awards

Books

References

External links
The Children's Environmental Health Center at Mount Sinai Medical Center
Icahn School of Medicine at Mount Sinai

Living people
1942 births
American medical academics
American public health doctors
American pediatricians
Boston Latin School alumni
Boston College alumni
Harvard Medical School alumni
Harvard University staff
University of Cincinnati faculty
Alumni of the London School of Hygiene & Tropical Medicine
Icahn School of Medicine at Mount Sinai faculty
Members of the United States National Academy of Sciences
Members of the National Academy of Medicine
Foreign Members of the Russian Academy of Sciences
United States Navy Medical Corps officers